Zorky was the third ship of the  of the Soviet Navy.

Construction and career
The ship was built at Zhdanov Shipyard in Leningrad and was launched on 14 October 1959 and commissioned into the Northern Fleet on 23 December 1960.

On October 14, 1961, the ship entered the Baltic Fleet of the Soviet Navy. In 1966, she won the prize of the Commander-in-Chief of the Navy for missile training (as part of the IBM). May 19, 1966 reclassified into a large rocket ship (BRK).

In the period from May 29, 1969, to December 31, 1971, she was modernized and rebuilt according to the Project 57-A. On October 27, 1971, it was reclassified as a large anti-submarine ship (BOD).

Between December 1972 and February 1973, the ship made a trip to Cuba.

From 12 to 17 November 1974, she paid a visit to Oslo (Norway). In the period from 12 to 17 April 1979, the ship visited Bissau (Guinea-Bissau). In the period from February 10, 1984, to February 17, 1987, she underwent a major overhaul at the shipyard No. 35 in Murmansk.

On June 1, 1992, the large anti-submarine ship was reclassified into a patrol ship. On June 30, 1993, she was decommissioned by the Russian Navy in connection with delivery to ARVI for disarmament, dismantling and sale. On December 31, the ship's crew was disbanded. On July 18, 1995, the ship's hull was sold to an American firm for cutting into metal in United States.

Pennant numbers

References

In Russian

External links

 
 
Gallery of the ship. Navsource. Retrieved 11 August 2021

Ships built at Severnaya Verf
Kanin-class destroyers
1960 ships
Cold War destroyers of the Soviet Union